The discography of Zard, a Japanese J-pop band, consists of eleven studio albums and forty-five singles. All songs were written by Izumi Sakai.

Albums

Studio albums

Compilation albums

Live albums

Tribute albums

Singles

DVD

References

Discographies of Japanese artists
Pop music group discographies